"And So Is Love" is a song written and recorded by musician Kate Bush.  It was the fifth and final single release from the album The Red Shoes. Guest star Eric Clapton plays guitar on the track. The Hammond organ is by Gary Brooker of Procol Harum.

Released on 7 November 1994, the single climbed to number 26 in the UK Singles Chart. Its entry into the Top 40 marked Bush's first appearance on Top of the Pops in eight years.  The lyric is about the end of a love affair, with the narrator declaring that both life and love are sad, and deciding that for the "sake of love," the two must set each other free.

"Eat the Music" also appears on the UK "And So Is Love" CD single, in the same version as on the 12-inch single featured on the U.S. CD and cassingle.  Additionally, there is a third version, the so-called "Extended Mix" which appears on the European and Australian singles, and which is actually 12 seconds shorter than the LP mix.

Track listings
7" single

CD single

Charts

New version
Bush recorded a new version of the song, with changed lyrics, for her album Director's Cut.

References

External links

Kate Bush songs
1994 singles
Songs written by Kate Bush
1993 songs
EMI Records singles